Jason Millard (born September 2, 1989) is an American professional golfer.

Millard initially qualified for the 2014 U.S. Open, but later disqualified himself over a potential infraction.

In 2015 Millard won the Freedom 55 Financial Championship to finish fifth in the 2015 PGA Tour Canada Order of Merit.  This finish gives him a conditional status for the 2016 Web.com Tour. He improved his status with a T2 finish at the Web.com Tour Qualifying Tournament.

Professional wins (3)

PGA Tour Canada wins (1)

Other wins (2)
2016 Tennessee Open
2019 Maine Open

References

External links

American male golfers
Middle Tennessee Blue Raiders men's golfers
Golfers from Tennessee
People from Murfreesboro, Tennessee
1989 births
Living people